You Don't Have to Say You Love Me is the fourth album of singer Dusty Springfield to be released in the USA, issued on the Philips Records label in 1966. The album was more or less a retitled re-issue of Springfield's British album Ev'rything's Coming Up Dusty, recorded and released in 1965, with the addition of the two hit singles "You Don't Have To Say You Love Me" and "Little By Little", both released in 1966. In fact, Ev'rything's Coming Up Dusty had been released in the US a few months prior, but as the title track of You Don't Have to Say You Love Me became a huge hit single for Springfield, Philips USA decided to repackage and retitle the album after the single.

The album was first released on CD by Mercury Records/Universal Music in 1999, then with the remaining three tracks from Ev'rything's Coming Up Dusty as bonus features.

Track listing
All tracks from 1965 album Ev'rything's Coming Up Dusty unless otherwise noted

Side A
"You Don't Have to Say You Love Me" (Pino Donaggio, Vito Pallavicini, Simon Napier-Bell, Vicki Wickham) - 2:47 
 First release: Philips UK single BF 1482 (A-side), 25 March 1966
"Won't Be Long" (J. Leslie McFarland) - 3:20 
"Oh No Not My Baby" (Gerry Goffin, Carole King) - 2:49
"Long After Tonight Is All Over" (Burt Bacharach, Hal David) - 2:37  
"La Bamba" (Traditional) - 2:34
"Who Can I Turn To (When Nobody Needs Me)" (Anthony Newley, Leslie Bricusse) - 3:23

Side B
"Little by Little"  (Buddy Kaye, Bea Verdi, Eddie Gin) - 2:33
 First release: Philips UK single BF 1466 (A-side), 21 January 1966  
"If It Don't Work Out" (Rod Argent) - 2:44
"It Was Easier to Hurt Him" (Bert Russell, Jerry Ragovoy) - 2:43 
"I've Been Wrong Before" (Randy Newman) - 2:21 
"I Can't Hear You" (Gerry Goffin, Carole King) - 2:27
"I Had a Talk with My Man"  (Billy Davis, Lenny Caston) - 2:52  
 
Bonus tracks 1999 reissue
"Doodlin'" (Horace Silver, Jon Hendricks) - 2:46
"That's How Heartaches Are Made" (Ben Raleigh, Bob Halley) - 2:44 
"Packin' Up" (Margie Hendrix) - 2:04

Personnel and production
 Dusty Springfield - lead vocals, backing vocals
 Doris Troy - backing vocals
 Madeline Bell - backing vocals
 The Echoes - accompaniment
 Johnny Franz - record producer
 Ivor Raymonde - accompaniment & orchestra director
 Roger Wake - digital remastering (UK) (1999 re-issue)
 Mike Gill - digital remastering (UK) (1999 re-issue)

References
 Howes, Paul (2001). The Complete Dusty Springfield. London: Reynolds & Hearn Ltd. .

Dusty Springfield albums
1966 albums
Albums produced by Johnny Franz
Philips Records albums